People's World, official successor to the Daily Worker, is a Marxist and American leftist national daily online news publication. Founded by activists, socialists, communists, and those active in the labor movement in the early 1900s, the current publication is a result of a merger between the Daily World and the West Coast weekly paper People's Daily World in 1987.

History
People's World traces its lineage to the Daily Worker newspaper, founded by communists, socialists, union members, and other activists in Chicago in 1924. On the front page of its first edition, the paper declared that "big business interests, bankers, merchant princes, landlords, and other profiteers" should fear the Daily Worker. It pledged to "raise the standards of struggle against the few who rob and plunder the many".

The current publication is a result of a merger between the Daily World (formerly known as the Daily Worker) and the West Coast weekly paper People's Daily World.

The Daily Worker was a national newspaper first published in 1924. It became known as the Daily World in 1968.

The People's Daily World was first launched in 1938. Its founder, Harrison George, started People's Daily World in San Francisco after he raised $33,000 from supporters in California. The paper had 20,000 readers and cost 3 cents. The paper circulated throughout the West Coast. It was completely funded through subscribers.

After World War II, many of the editors of People's Daily World were convicted using the Smith Act of "conspiring to violently overthrow the U.S. government". During the 1950s, reporters from the paper were not allowed in the press galleries of various California governing bodies. Circulation was also down in the 1950s, with the paper only having a press run of 5,000 in 1955. In 1957, the paper became a weekly publication.

In 1986, the Daily World merged with People's Daily World.

Its publisher is Long View Publishing Company. The online newspaper is a member of the International Labor Communications Association and is indexed in the Alternative Press Index. Its staff belong to the NewsGuild-CWA labor union, and by extension AFL–CIO.

People's World also has a Spanish language section called Mundo Popular.

In 2009, People's World was re-launched as an online news publication where it continues to publish news on a daily basis.

About 

People's World is funded by its supporters and published by a small staff, and a network of volunteers. The newspaper is a member of the International Labor Communications Association.

On January 1, 2010, the People's World became an online-only publication using Creative Commons license.

Notable reporters and writers 
The journal has had several notable reporters and columnists.

Woodie Guthrie, early columnist, writing 253 articles, most during 1939.
 Alice Greenfield McGrath, reporter.
 Ella Reeve Bloor, early columnist and reporter

References

External links
  
People's World at the Library of Congress

Creative Commons-licensed websites
Online newspapers with defunct print editions
Newspapers established in 1938
Marxism
Socialism
Online journalism